This is a list of settlements in Derbyshire by population based on the results of the 2011 census. The next United Kingdom census will take place in 2021, with results in 2022. In 2011, there were 42 settlements with 5,000 or more inhabitants in Derbyshire, shown in the table below.

List of settlements

See also
List of places in Derbyshire
List of civil parishes in Derbyshire

References

External links 
 ONS Census website

 
Settlements
Derbyshire